Rossendale is a district with borough status in Lancashire, England, located along the River Irwell and spanning a large valley. It is located south of Burnley and east of Blackburn. The borough borders Greater Manchester to the south and borders the boroughs of Bolton, Bury and Rochdale.

In the 2001 census the population of Rossendale was 65,652, spread between the towns of Bacup, Haslingden, Whitworth and Rawtenstall; the villages of Crawshawbooth, Edenfield, Helmshore and Waterfoot; and as well as Britannia, Broadclough, Chatterton, Cloughfold, Cowpe, Irwell Vale, Loveclough, Newchurch, Shawforth, Stacksteads, Stubbins, Turn and Weir. The population at the 2011 Census had risen to 67,922.
 
The district was formed on 1 April 1974 under the Local Government Act 1972, from the municipal boroughs of Bacup, Haslingden, Rawtenstall, part of Ramsbottom Urban District and Whitworth Urban District.

Rossendale is twinned with the German town of Bocholt, located close to the Netherlands border.

The name "Rossendale" may also refer geographically to Rossendale Valley, and historically refers to the medieval Forest or "Chase" of Rossendale, which encompassed approximately the same area as the modern district.

Rossendale is part of the Rossendale and Darwen constituency.  Jake Berry MP has been the member of parliament for Rossendale and Darwen since 2010.

All of Rossendale is unparished, except for Whitworth, which has a town council.

Urban Area
The borough forms a large part of the Accrington/Rossendale Built-up area which covers the borough and parts of the neighboring borough of Hyndburn. The Accrington/Rossendale Built-up area extends from the towns of Rawtenstall and Bacup to Accrington which takes in parts of the boroughs of Hyndburn and Rossendale. The area was recorded at having a population of 125,059.

History and industry
Rossendale is part of the Forest of Rossendale, which consists of the steep-sided valleys of the River Irwell and its tributaries, which flow from the Pennines southwards to Manchester and cut through the moorland which is characteristic of the area. It was given the designation of "forest" in medieval times denoting a hunting reserve.

The larger settlements grew into market towns, typically through the late Middle Ages. Farming and a cottage woollen industry developed during the reign of Henry VIII, but Rossendale's population only really expanded during the period of the Industrial Revolution. The population was 16,033 in 1801; in 1901 it had grown to 89,540 (relevant censuses). Its wet and damp climate are ideally suited to the development of watermills, and later to the mechanisation of the wool and cotton spinning and weaving industries in the 18th and 19th centuries. In the middle of the 19th century a felt industry developed, and from this the manufacturing of slippers so that footwear also became a major employer in the area.

The area became one of the cradles of the Industrial Revolution, and was known as 'The Golden Valley'. There was great hardship among working people during this time, but many fortunes were made among the mill-owning classes. There was large-scale immigration from Ireland to find work building the railways and in the mills, which led to several instances of serious civil disturbances between the two communities. Michael Davitt, the Irish republican leader was among these immigrants, settling in Haslingden, where he received his education after losing an arm at the age of 11 in a mill accident.

The area is also notable for its quarrying, and Rossendale Flagstone was used widely throughout the country in the 19th century. The flagstones in Trafalgar Square in London were quarried in Rossendale. Upland farming is still carried out, largely of sheep but also of cattle. The history of Rossendale is well documented, largely through the efforts of the historian Chris Aspin, a specialist on the textile industry, and Derek Pilkington, whose efforts led to the preservation of Higher Mill in Helmshore, now Helmshore Mills Textile Museum.

The Whitworth Doctors were local surgeons and bone setters whose reputation spread far and wide, so that they treated patients from throughout the country, including Princess Elizabeth and the Archbishop of Canterbury. In 1819 William Hewitt described them as "the most remarkable men of their class that ever appeared in England".

R.S. Ireland (The Real Lancashire Black Pudding Co.) is based near Haslingden; a family-run business of specialist black pudding makers, using only traditional methods and with a recipe dating back to 1879. Rawtenstall has Fitzpatricks Herbal Health, this is the last remaining functioning temperance bar in England, that makes and sells its own non-alcoholic drinks, such as sarsaparilla, black beers and blood tonic.

Etymology
The name Rossendale first appeared in 1292. A record of the name as Rocendal (1242) suggests Celtic ros "moor, heath", with Old Norse dalr "dale, valley", hence moor valley i.e. the valley of the River Irwell.

Transport
The borough is linked by the motorway network to Manchester, Burnley and Blackburn via the A56/M65 and M66 motorways.

There was once a rail link south to Manchester via Bury, but this was closed in 1966 as part of cuts following the Beeching Report. Part of the old railway reopened in 1991 as the East Lancashire Railway operating a service from Rawtenstall to Bury via Ramsbottom and Summerseat, and manned by volunteers. In September 2003 an eastbound extension from Bury to Heywood was opened.

In March 2015, it was proposed to reintroduce a rail service between Rawtenstall, Bury and Manchester. This would use the current route of the East Lancashire Heritage Railway.

The area is well served by public road transport, with bus services provided mainly by Rosso and Burnley Bus Company. These provide regular services to Burnley, Blackburn, Accrington, Bolton, Bury, Manchester and Rochdale as well as Todmorden and other local destinations.

Education in Rossendale
Rossendale contains multiple secondary schools, these are:
 All Saints' Catholic High School
 Alder Grange School
 Bacup and Rawtenstall Grammar School (selective state school)
 Haslingden High School
 The Valley Leadership Academy
 Whitworth Community High School
Rossendale School (Specialist Autism School)

In addition, there is Accrington and Rossendale College, based in Accrington.

The arts in Rossendale
Rossendale is the home to a large community of artists with several painters' studios, many of which are centred on the area around Waterfoot. Rossendale's only traditional theatre is in Bacup. The Royal Court Theatre first opened in 1893 and has a thriving Youth Theatre called The Rossendale Musical Theatre Academy. The theatre and arts centre known as 'The Boo' as well as being a regular venue for family theatre shows, music and a wide range of community arts events, is the home of the Horse and Bamboo Theatre Company who specialise in visual theatre, often using distinctive puppets and masks. The painters and other artists who make up the major studios within the valley – Globe Arts, Prospect Studio, Valley Artists – along with the Boo, the Whitaker, Apna Rossendale, and individual artists now work together to open their studios and premises each year at the Rossendale Art Trail Open Studios weekend in late summer.

The first part of the Irwell Sculpture Trail runs from Deerplay, above Bacup, to Stubbins. The actress Jane Horrocks was born in Rawtenstall, Rossendale, and the composer Alan Rawsthorne was born in Haslingden. Betty Jackson, the fashion designer, is a native of Bacup.

In the 18th and 19th centuries the Larks of Dean were an unusual group of working class musicians whose music-making at the Baptist Chapel in Goodshaw Fold became an important local feature. There is also a brass band tradition as well as an amateur theatre scene. There was once over 40 bands in and around Rossendale, including the Irwell Springs Band whose fame was at a peak at the turn of the 19th century. There are currently the Haslingden and Helmshore Band, Rossendale Encore Concert Band, Goodshaw Band, Stacksteads Band, Water Band, 2nd Rossendale Scout Group Band, Whitworth Vale & Healey Band, Whitworth Youth Band, Haslingden Concert Band and the Whitworth Veterans' Band. Rossendale is home to a unique dancing troupe, the Britannia Coconut Dancers, formed in the mid-19th century, and who traditionally dance along the local roads every Easter.

There has been a long tradition of dialect poetry and writing in Rossendale. Local poets have included Andrew Houston (The Rossendale Bard), Walter Hargreaves (Shepster) and Clifford Heyworth (Bill o' Bows). Waugh's Well, above Edenfield and Cowpe, marks the spot where Edwin Waugh wrote many of his poems, and is a favourite spot for walkers – a popular activity in Rossendale that does not appear to be in decline.

The Halo is an artwork in the form of an 18m-diameter steel lattice structure supported on a tripod overlooking Haslingden, positioned to be clearly visible from the M66 and A56 approach to Lancashire. Designed by John Kennedy and selected as part of a design competition managed by RIBA Competitions which was launched in 2003. It is lit after dark using low-energy LEDs powered by an adjacent wind turbine. It is the fourth Panopticon in Lancashire. It, and the adjacent landscaped area at Top o'Slate, was opened to the public in September 2007, and was designed by John Kennedy of LandLab and engineered by Booth King Partnership.

Rossendale is also home to touring theatre company Hard Graft.  Established in 1999 Hard Graft found notoriety in the UK touring non theatre venues.  Their first tour was with their award-winning comedy Thick As Thieves , touring living rooms throughout the UK.  They then toured 56 charity shops with Burt n Joyce turning each shop into a theatre for the evening.

Sports and entertainment
Three Rossendale towns have cricket clubs in the Lancashire League – Bacup, Haslingden and Rawtenstall. The overseas professionals who are associated with the League have therefore often lived in the Rossendale Valley. For example, Everton Weekes was long associated with Bacup; Clive Lloyd with Haslingden. Edenfield Cricket Club are also associated with the Lancashire League but only participate in the leagues T/20 competition.

Rossendale rugby club for many years had been a small rugby union club playing in the lower leagues, but in recent years the club has gained two promotions to take them into Regional 1 North West. Notable players such as Daniel Collins, Dave Wood and Tim Fourie now play at the valley side.

The area's only semi-pro non league football team are Bacup Borough F.C. who play their home games at West View and are members of the North West Counties League Division One. The area's other major non league side Rossendale United, who played their home games at nearby Newchurch near Rawtenstall, folded in 2011. The only other semi-pro team from the Rossendale area are Ramsbottom United who play in the Northern Premier League Division One North.  Previously there had been Haslingden F.C., playing at Ewood Bridge, on the outskirts of Haslingden, until they folded in 1998.  Their ground was later used briefly by Stand Athletic F.C. before they vacated and moved back to Whitefield in Greater Manchester.  Other clubs around the Rossendale area are all from Step 7 (Level 11) and below, and so playing in various leagues at this level – the West Lancashire Football League (Haslingden St Mary's), East Lancashire League (Stacksteads St Joseph's, Water FC), Lancashire Amateur League (Rossendale FC, Whitworth Valley, Valley United).

The popular comedy series, The League of Gentlemen, is apparently based upon Rossendale (and perhaps Bacup in particular), playing upon stereotypes and exaggerations of the area. Subsequently, the producers filmed in various northern towns, one of which was Bacup itself, which Jeremy Dyson (writer) and Steve Pemberton (actor) proclaimed, "Bacup was the furthest we went into Lancashire. Bacup was our hot favourite, but it was too frightening – when we arrived there was this cartoon drunk with a bottle shaking his fist at us. Bacup in real life was worse than Royston Vasey".

Various towns within the Rossendale Valley were used for filming scenes of the BBC TV series Hetty Wainthropp Investigates during the 1990s.

The 1980 drama Juliet Bravo was filmed in Rossendale.

During autumn 2008 areas around Rossendale were used in the filming of the BBC TV series Survivors including the Airtours site and other sites in Helmshore and Bank Street in Rawtenstall.

In 2012 Rossendale featured on the ITV reality television series May the Best House Win featuring former Rossendale Radio DJ Si Carvell.

Local radio station Rossendale Radio broadcast throughout the valley from 2010, before shutting down on 5 March 2012 due to financial difficulties. It then re-launched on 22 December 2018.

The Rossendale Male Voice Choir formed in the valley in 1924.

Settlements

Civil parishes
 Whitworth is the only civil parish in Rossendale.

Notable current and past residents
For notable past residents see individual towns and villages
Agyness Deyn – model
Natalie Casey – actress/presenter (Hollyoaks)
Jane Horrocks – actress
Ted Robbins – actor/comedian (Phoenix Nights)
William Roache – actor
Phil Neville – footballer (Everton)
Sam Aston – actor (Coronation Street)
Jennie McAlpine – actress (Coronation Street)
Andy Kershaw – DJ/reporter
Liz Kershaw – DJ
Karl Burns – punk drummer from The Fall
David Trippier – Former Conservative environment minister
Michael Carr – Former Liberal Democrat MP
Frankee Connolly – member of music duo Mini Viva
Phil Lester – YouTuber, author, and former BBC Radio 1 presenter
Chris Allen – Lead Vocalist, The Troggs

Councillors

The council is elected in thirds with one third of the council up for election each time. Every fourth year residents vote for candidates for Lancashire county council. The borough is made up of 14 electoral wards and there are 36 councillors the council is currently under Labour control.

· Labour 21
· Conservative 14
· Community First 1

The wards of Rossendale are Cribden, Eden, Facit & Shawforth, Goodshaw, Greenfield, Greensclough, Hareholme, Healey & Whitworth, Helmshore, Irwell, Longholme, Stacksteads, Whitewell and Worsley.

The Key personal with the council are
Chief Executive – Stuart Sugarman
Mayor – Anne Kenyon (Labour)
Deputy Mayor – No Deputy in place for 2017
Leader of the council – Alyson Barnes (Labour)
Leader of the opposition – Brian Essex (Conservative)

Taxis
In the 2010s, RBC was criticised for issuing a large number of private hire licences to drivers who then worked in areas outside Rossendale, such as Manchester city centre, without local knowledge of those areas.

Twin town 
Rossendale Borough Council is twinned with:
  Bocholt, Germany

References

External links
Official web site

Higher Mill Textile Museum
Rossendale Male Voice Choir
Second Rosendale Scout Band

 

 
Non-metropolitan districts of Lancashire
Boroughs in England